Arc Light, also known as The Shining Arc, is a 1989 Chinese drama film directed by Zhang Junzhao. It was entered into the 16th Moscow International Film Festival.

Cast
 Weigang Fan as Doctor Zheng
 Yang Gao as Floricultural old man
 Ping Guan as Jing Zhi
 Bai Ling as Jing Huan
 Xiaohua Luo as Jing's mother
 Yuanzhi Tang as Jing Hongcun
 Yanjie Tong as Xie Hong
 Xiong Xiao as Xie Ni
 Guangbei Zhang as Liu Kai
 Zhenyao Zheng as Xiao Bo
 Yitong Zhi as Xie Zining

References

External links
 

1989 films
1989 crime drama films
Chinese drama films
1980s Mandarin-language films